Anita Ghulam Ali (1934–2014) was an educational expert in Sindh, Pakistan. She was a recipient of Pride of Performance Awards (1999) and Sitara-e-Imtiaz.

Early life 
Anita was born on October 2, 1934, in Karachi, Pakistan. Her father was Feroz Nana, a judge in the Sindh High Court. Her mother, Shereen Feroz, was the daughter of Mirza Nadir Baig. Anita received her early education in Maharashtra, India. After returning to Karachi, she graduated from the University of Sindh in 1980. In 1983 she received a B.Sc. from the Women College D.J in Karachi.

Career
Anita Ghulam Ali started her broadcast career with Radio Pakistan, Karachi in the late 1950s as an English language news broadcaster and served in that position for almost 2 decades. Professor Anita Ghulam Ali was a popular English news broadcaster in the 1960s.

She started her career as a teacher in Microbiology at Sindh Muslim Science College, Karachi in 1961. She taught at that college until 1985. She was appointed Minister of Education, Culture, Science, Technology, Youth, and Sports. She was an assistant professor at Sindh Muslim Science College in 1987. During that time, she was the leader of the Pakistan Teachers Association and worked at Radio Pakistan as a newscaster for 20 years.

She wrote many articles relating to the education of women. She wrote books in English about Sindhi embroidery and the secrets of the Palace.

She was appointed as an education minister in 1996 under the provincial caretaker government.  

Anita represented Pakistan at various international forums of education and development. She was the recipient of Sitara-i-Imtiaz Award. She was managing director of Sindh Education Foundation.

Recognition 
She was awarded the Benazir Women Excellence Award at the 5th International Conference on Women's Leadership held in Karachi.

She died of a respiratory illness at Karachi's South City Hospital on 8 August 2014.

References

1934 births
2014 deaths
Sindhi people
Pakistani broadcasters
Pakistani educators
Recipients of Sitara-i-Imtiaz
Recipients of the Pride of Performance